Satan's Slaves 2: Communion also referred to as Satan's Slaves 2 is a 2022 Indonesian
supernatural horror film written and directed by Joko Anwar. It is the sequel to the 2017 film Satan's Slaves, itself based on the 1980 film Satan's Slave. It is the first Indonesian film to be released in IMAX format. Upon its release, Anwar indicated plans for a possible third instalment in the series.

The film opened at number one at Indonesian box offices and surpassed one million admissions after two days, and surpassed two million admissions in just four days. Satan's Slaves 2: Communion is currently the third highest-grossing Indonesian film of all time, with 6.3 million admissions.

Synopsis  
In 1955, journalist Budiman Syailendra is kidnapped and taken to a remote area on the outskirts of Lembang. Upon arrival, it is revealed he is brought there by his friend, Chief of Police Heru Kusuma, who shows him a large number of exhumed corpses arranged in an observatory. Worried that announcing the grisly scene will disrupt the Bandung Conference happening the following day, he instructs Budiman to publicise it, but only via obscure magazines.

In 1984, Rini and her younger brothers, Toni and Bondi, and their Father have been living in a North Jakarta apartment block flat for the past four years. A major rainstorm cuts the power and floods the lower floors of the building. In an attempted evacuation, an elevator accident violently kills a number of apartment residents.

With the power still out, a little girl named Wina, whose friends died in the accident, is tricked by ghosts and falls down the same elevator shaft. Toni helps Ustadz, a religious apartment resident, search the building and meet other residents, including Dino and Tari. Toni helps Dino recover a fork from a hole in the wall to the neighbouring apartment, finding a photo album that shows occult rituals and pictures of their deceased mother. Rini meets Wisnu, a child orphaned by the elevator accident, who speaks a "secret sign language" that he learned from a book.

Becoming suspicious at never knowing their father's occupation, Rini secretly steals his suitcase while he sleeps, later revealed to be full of dismembered human fingers. Bondi opens one apartment to find their deceased brother Ian, who cannot recall how he got there. Tari and Dino flee and are both killed by ghosts.

Wisnu speaks to Ian with the same "secret sign language". The father finds his children have opened the suitcase, and tells them he was trying to protect them from their deceased mother, who is known as Raminom. The group are attacked by animated corpses. Rini wakes up in a room full of black-clad figures conducting a Satanic ritual orchestrated by Ian. Her father is executed by horses. As the cult begin to tie up Toni, Budiman arrives with Wisnu, shooting several cult members and allowing them to escape by boat.

On the boat, Budiman explains that their father, who used to be a policeman, joined a Satanic cult and did a deal with them, where he had to kill 1,000 people. He also says the children remain the target of the cult.

The following day, Darminah and Batara return to their apartment, where they admit they missed the events of the previous night, although this was part of their plan. A photograph on the wall reveals they attended the 1955 Bandung Conference, and they do not appear to have aged since.

Cast 
 Tara Basro as Rini Suwono
 Endy Arfian as Toni Suwono
 Bront Palarae as Bahri Suwono / Father
 Ratu Felisha as Tari Daryati
 Nasar Anuz as Bondi Suwono
 Muhammad Adhiyat as Ian Suwono
 Jourdy Pranata as Dino Suhendar
 Muzakki Ramdhan as Wisnu Hendrawan
 Fatih Unru as Ari Gunawan
 Ayu Laksmi as Mawarni Suwono (Mother) / Raminom 
 Egi Fedly as Budiman Syailendra
 Nafiza Fatia Rani sebagai Wina Endarti
 Kiki Narendra as Ustaz Mahmud
 Rukman Rosadi as Heru Kusuma
 Muhammad Abe as Ari Father's
 Asmara Abigail as Darminah
 Fachri Albar as Batara
 Maera Panigoro as Diana Sasmi
 Sita Nursanti as Hayati Darsono
 Patty Sandya as Ari Mother's
 Mian Tiara as Wisnu Mother's
 Mukhlist Abot as Wisnu Father's
 Irfani Zhang as The Body Of The Elevator Accident
 Aimee Saras as news anchor
 Ramadhan Al Rasyid as a taxi driver 
 Tommy Dewo as mourner 
 Rieviena Yulieta as radio announcer 
 Tia Hasibuan as a radio caller

Release 
Satan's Slaves 2: Communion was released on August 4 in Indonesia, and August 11 in Malaysia.

Satan's Slaves 2: Communion was also as the first Indonesian and Southeast Asia film released on IMAX format. It also made it to 'Midnight Passion' section of 27th Busan International Film Festival to be screened in October 2022. Like its predecessor, it was acquired by Shudder in September 2022 for exclusive distribution in the U.S., Canada, the United Kingdom, Ireland, Australia, and New Zealand, with the platform announcing the film's streaming release date for November 4.

Reception

Box office
Satan's Slaves 2: Communion opened with a record 701,891 admissions, which is the second highest opening day for local film. It surpassed 3 million viewers on 5th day of its release, as of August 25 it is the second  highest grossing local film of the year 2022 in Indonesia with 6.3 million admission and an estimated gross Rp254 billion (US$17.09 million). In Malaysia, Satan's Slaves 2 has grossed RM9.5 million (US$2.1 million).

Critical reception 

Richard Kulpers gave the film a positive review in Variety, saying "A couple of subplots don’t add much, and the frantic finale squeezes in more information than is required to pave the way for a sequel. But these are relatively minor flaws in a film distinguished by exciting visuals, top-notch production design, wonderfully gooey makeup design and convincing performances from a uniformly fine cast." In a 3.5 star review in Bloody Disgusting, Meagan Navarro concluded "Anwar’s commitment to horror and inventive scare crafting ensures that we’ll sign up for a third round to see where it goes from here."

See also
 Indonesian horror

Notes

References

External links
 
 
 Satan's Slaves: Communion at Shudder
 Satan's Slaves: Communion at Film Indonesia
 Satan's Slaves 2: Communion on YouTube

Indonesian horror films
2022 horror films
2022 films
2020s supernatural horror films
2020s Indonesian-language films
Indonesian supernatural horror films
Films directed by Joko Anwar
Folk horror films
IMAX films
Films shot in Indonesia
Films about Satanism
Religious horror films
Shudder (streaming service) original programming
Films set in 1955
Films set in 1984
Indonesian sequel films
Films based on Indonesian myths and legends
Films about deaf people
Films set in Java
Films set in Jakarta
Sign-language films